There are at least 63 named lakes and reservoirs in Miller County, Arkansas.

Lakes
	Adams Cut-off Lake, el. 
	Alligator Lake, el. 
	Candler Lake, el. 
	Clark Lake, el. 
	Clear Lake, el. 
	Cypress City Lake, el. 
	Cypress Lake, el. 
	Elliott Slough, el. 
	First Old River Lake, el. 
	Fish Lake, el. 
	Ford Slough, el. 
	Goose Lake, el. 
	Haley Lake, el. 
	Harper Lake, el. 
	Keller Lake, el. 
	Kennedy Lake, el. 
	Kuykendall Lake, el. 
	Little Pond, el. 
	Long Slough, el. 
	Mathis Slough, el. 
	Mercer Lake, el. 
	Moes Slough, el. 
	Nineteen hundred and forty Cut-off Lake, el. 
	Palmer Lake, el. 
	Pinhook Lake, el. 
	Red Lake, el. 
	Scott Lake, el. 
	Second Old River Lake, el. 
	Snaggy Lake, el. 
	Snake Lake, el. 
	Tobe Lake, el. 
	Whites Camp Lake, el. 
	Willow Lake, el. 
	Winham Lake, el.

Reservoirs
	Arkla Lake, el. 
	Boyce Lake, el. 
	Browns Lake, el. 
	Buford Lake, el. 
	Coca Cola Lake, el. 
	Country Club, el. 
	Cox Lake, el. 
	Crabtree Lake, el. 
	Davis Lake, el. 
	Davis Lake Number Two, el. 
	Eason Lake, el. 
	Gill Lake, el. 
	Hensley Lake, el. 
	Jones Lake, el. 
	Lower Lake, el. 
	Lower Moore Lake, el. 
	Mitchell Lake, el. 
	Old Bitty Lake, el. 
	Paradise Lake, el. 
	Robinson Lake, el. 
	Smith Lake, el. 
	Smith Lake, el. 
	State Line Lake, el. 
	Upper Lake, el. 
	Upper Moore Lake, el. 
	Wadley Lake, el. 
	Westmoreland Lake, el. 
	Williams Lake, el. 
	Wooten Lake, el.

See also

 List of lakes in Arkansas

Notes

Bodies of water of Miller County, Arkansas
Miller